The Simón Bolívar Station is a station on Line 1 of the Monterrey Metro. It is located on Simón Bolivar Avenue. This station is located in the Colon Avenue in the northeast side of the Monterrey Centre. The station was opened on 25 April 1991 as part of the inaugural section of Line 1, going from San Bernabé to Exposición.

This station serves the Central Mitras neighborhood (Colonia Mitras Centro), it is accessible for people with disabilities.

This station is named after Simón Bolivar Avenue, and its logo represents a stylized head shot of Simón Bolivar, one of the Liberators of Spanish South America.

References

Metrorrey stations
Railway stations opened in 1991
1991 establishments in Mexico